Michael Parsa is a Canadian politician who was elected to the Legislative Assembly of Ontario during the 2018 general election. He represents the riding of Aurora—Oak Ridges—Richmond Hill, and is a member of the Progressive Conservative Party of Ontario.

Background 
Parsa has a B.A. in organizational management. Prior to entering politics, he ran a family business which had been operating in the Greater Toronto Area since 1990. He served on the board of the Optimist Club and served as its president from 2005 to 2009.

Political career

2015 Federal Election 
Parsa ran in the 2015 Canadian federal election as the Conservative Party of Canada candidate in the Ontario riding of Richmond Hill and finished second to Liberal Majid Jowhari.

Provincial parliament roles 
Parsa was elected to the Legislative Assembly of Ontario during the 2018 Ontario election in the riding of Aurora—Oak Ridges—Richmond Hill. He served as Parliamentary Assistant to the Minister of Economic Development, Job Creation and Trade (Small Business) from June 29, 2018 to June 26, 2019 and has served as Parliamentary Assistant to the President of the Treasury Board from July 26, 2019  to June 24, 2022. Parsa has also been a member of the Standing Committee on Public Accounts since July 26, 2018. He is currently the Associate Minister for Municipal Affairs and Housing.

Personal life 
Parsa has lived in Aurora—Oak Ridges—Richmond Hill since 2002.

Election results

References

Living people
Progressive Conservative Party of Ontario MPPs
21st-century Canadian politicians
Conservative Party of Canada candidates for the Canadian House of Commons
Canadian politicians of Iranian descent
Iranian emigrants to Canada
Year of birth missing (living people)